Johannes Vermeer (see below; also known as Jan Vermeer; October 1632 – 15 December 1675) was a Dutch Baroque Period painter who specialized in domestic interior scenes of middle-class life. During his lifetime, he was a moderately successful provincial genre painter, recognized in Delft and The Hague. Nonetheless, he produced relatively few paintings and evidently was not wealthy, leaving his wife and children in debt at his death.

Vermeer worked slowly and with great care, and frequently used very expensive pigments. He is particularly renowned for his masterly treatment and use of light in his work.

"Almost all his paintings", Hans Koningsberger wrote, "are apparently set in two smallish rooms in his house in Delft; they show the same furniture and decorations in various arrangements and they often portray the same people, mostly women."

His modest celebrity gave way to obscurity after his death. He was barely mentioned in Arnold Houbraken's major source book on 17th-century Dutch painting (Grand Theatre of Dutch Painters and Women Artists) and was thus omitted from subsequent surveys of Dutch art for nearly two centuries. In the 19th century, Vermeer was rediscovered by Gustav Friedrich Waagen and Théophile Thoré-Bürger, who published an essay attributing 66 pictures to him, although only 34 paintings are universally attributed to him today. Since that time, Vermeer's reputation has grown, and he is now acknowledged as one of the greatest painters of the Dutch Golden Age.

Similar to other major Dutch Golden Age artists such as Frans Hals and Rembrandt, Vermeer never went abroad. Also, like Rembrandt, he was an avid art collector and dealer.

Pronunciation of name
Another pronunciation, is attested from the UK.

Life

Relatively little was known about Vermeer's life until recently. He seems to have been devoted exclusively to his art, living out his life in the city of Delft. Until the 19th century, the only sources of information were a few registers, official documents, and comments by other artists; for this reason, Thoré-Bürger named him "The Sphinx of Delft". John Michael Montias added details on the family from the city archives of Delft in his Artists and Artisans in Delft: A Socio-Economic Study of the Seventeenth Century (1982).

Youth and heritage

Johannes Vermeer was baptized within the Reformed Church on 31 October 1632. His mother, Digna Baltens (c. 1596–1670) was from Antwerp. Digna's father, Balthasar Geerts, or Gerrits, (born in Antwerp in or around 1573) led an enterprising life in metalworking, and was arrested for counterfeiting. Vermeer's father, named Reijnier Janszoon, was a middle-class worker of silk or caffa (a mixture of silk and cotton or wool). He was the son of Jan Reyersz and Cornelia (Neeltge) Goris. As an apprentice in Amsterdam, Reijnier lived on fashionable Sint Antoniesbreestraat, a street with many resident painters at the time. In 1615, Reijnier married Digna. The couple moved to Delft and had a daughter named Gertruy who was baptized in 1620. In 1625, Reijnier was involved in a fight with a soldier named Willem van Bylandt who died from his wounds five months later. Around this time, Reijnier began dealing in paintings. In 1631, he leased an inn, which he called "The Flying Fox". In 1635, he lived on Voldersgracht 25 or 26. In 1641, he bought a larger inn on the market square, named after the Flemish town "Mechelen". The acquisition of the inn constituted a considerable financial burden. When Reijnier died in October 1652, Vermeer took over the operation of the family's art business.

Marriage and family

In April 1653, Johannes Reijniersz Vermeer married a Catholic woman, Catharina Bolenes (Bolnes). The blessing took place in the quiet nearby village of Schipluiden. Vermeer's new mother-in-law Maria Thins was initially opposed to the marriage as she was significantly wealthier than he, and it was probably she who insisted that Vermeer convert to Catholicism before the marriage on 5 April. The fact that Vermeer's father was in considerable debt also did not help in discussions on the marriage. Leonaert Bramer, who was Catholic himself, put in a good word for Vermeer and it was this that led Maria to drop her oppositions. According to art historian Walter Liedtke, Vermeer's conversion seems to have been made with conviction. His painting The Allegory of Faith, made between 1670 and 1672, placed less emphasis on the artists' usual naturalistic concerns and more on symbolic religious applications, including the sacrament of the Eucharist. Walter Liedtke in Dutch Paintings in the Metropolitan Museum of Art suggests that it was made for a learned and devout Catholic patron, perhaps for his schuilkerk, or "hidden church". At some point, the couple moved in with Catharina's mother, who lived in a rather spacious house at Oude Langendijk, almost next to a hidden Jesuit church. Here Vermeer lived for the rest of his life, producing paintings in the front room on the second floor. His wife gave birth to 15 children, four of whom were buried before being baptized, but were registered as "child of Johan Vermeer". The names of 10 of Vermeer's children are known from wills written by relatives: Maertge, Elisabeth, Cornelia, Aleydis, Beatrix, Johannes, Gertruyd, Franciscus, Catharina, and Ignatius. Several of these names carry a religious connotation, and the youngest (Ignatius) was likely named after the founder of the Jesuit order.

Career

It is unclear where and with whom Vermeer apprenticed as a painter. There is some speculation that Carel Fabritius may have been his teacher, based upon a controversial interpretation of a text written in 1668 by printer Arnold Bon. Art historians have found no hard evidence to support this. Local authority Leonaert Bramer acted as a friend, but their style of painting is rather different. Liedtke suggests that Vermeer taught himself using information from one of his father's connections. Some scholars think that Vermeer was trained under Catholic painter Abraham Bloemaert. Vermeer's style is similar to that of some of the Utrecht Caravaggists, whose works are depicted as paintings-within-paintings in the backgrounds of several of his compositions.

On 29 December 1653, Vermeer became a member of the Guild of Saint Luke, a trade association for painters. The guild's records make clear that Vermeer did not pay the usual admission fee. It was a year of plague, war, and economic crisis; Vermeer was not alone in experiencing difficult financial circumstances. In 1654, the city suffered the terrible explosion known as the Delft Thunderclap, which destroyed a large section of the city. In 1657, he might have found a patron in local art collector Pieter van Ruijven, who lent him some money. It seems that Vermeer turned for inspiration to the art of the fijnschilders from Leiden. Vermeer was responding to the market of Gerard Dou's paintings, who sold his paintings for exorbitant prices. Dou may have influenced Pieter de Hooch and Gabriel Metsu, too. Vermeer also charged higher than average prices for his work, most of which were purchased by an unknown collector.

The influence of Johannes Vermeer on Metsu is unmistakable: the light from the left, the marble floor. (A. Waiboer, however, suggests that Metsu requires more emotional involvement of the viewer.) Vermeer probably competed also with Nicolaes Maes, who produced genre works in a similar style. In 1662, Vermeer was elected head of the guild and was reelected in 1663, 1670, and 1671, evidence that he (like Bramer) was considered an established craftsman among his peers. Vermeer worked slowly, probably producing three paintings a year on order. Balthasar de Monconys visited him in 1663 to see some of his work, but Vermeer had no paintings to show. The diplomat and the two French clergymen who accompanied him were sent to Hendrick van Buyten, a baker who had a couple of his paintings as collateral.

In 1671, Gerrit van Uylenburgh organised the auction of Gerrit Reynst's collection and offered 13 paintings and some sculptures to Frederick William, Elector of Brandenburg. Frederick accused them of being counterfeits and had sent 12 back on the advice of Hendrick Fromantiou. Van Uylenburg then organized a counter-assessment, asking a total of 35 painters to pronounce on their authenticity, including Jan Lievens, Melchior de Hondecoeter, Gerbrand van den Eeckhout, and Johannes Vermeer.

Wars and death

In 1672, a severe economic downturn (the "Year of Disaster") struck the Netherlands, after Louis XIV and a French army invaded the Dutch Republic from the south (known as the Franco-Dutch War). During the Third Anglo-Dutch War, an English fleet attacked by sea, and two allied German bishops invaded the country from the east, causing more destruction. Many people panicked; courts, theaters, shops and schools were closed. Vermeer's sale of  that year was his last. Five years passed before circumstances improved. In 1674, Vermeer was listed as a member of the civic guards. In the summer of 1675, Vermeer borrowed 1,000 guilders in Amsterdam from Jacob Romboutsz (grandfather of Hendrick Sorgh), an Amsterdam silk trader, using his mother-in-law's property as a surety.

On 15 December 1675, Vermeer died after a short illness aged 43. He was buried in the Protestant Old Church on 15 December 1675. In a petition to her creditors, his wife later described his death as follows: 
...during the ruinous war with France he not only was unable to sell any of his art but also, to his great detriment, was left sitting with the paintings of other masters that he was dealing in. As a result and owing to the great burden of his children having no means of his own, he lapsed into such decay and decadence, which he had so taken to heart that, as if he had fallen into a frenzy, in a day and a half he went from being healthy to being dead.

Catharina Bolnes attributed her husband's death to the stress of financial pressures. The collapse of the art market damaged Vermeer's business as both a painter and an art dealer. She had to raise 11 children and therefore asked the High Court to relieve her of debts owed to Vermeer's creditors. Pioneering Dutch microscopist Antonie van Leeuwenhoek, who worked for the city council as a surveyor, was appointed trustee. The house had eight rooms on the first floor, the contents of which were listed in an inventory taken a few months after Vermeer's death. In his studio, there were two chairs, two painter's easels, three palettes, 10 canvases, a desk, an oak pull table, a small wooden cupboard with drawers, and "rummage not worthy being itemized". Nineteen of Vermeer's paintings were bequeathed to Catharina and her mother. The widow sold two more paintings to Hendrick van Buyten to pay off a substantial debt.

Vermeer had been a respected artist in Delft, but he was almost unknown outside his hometown. A local patron named Pieter van Ruijven had purchased much of his output, which kept Vermeer afloat financially but reduced the possibility of his fame spreading. Several factors contributed to his limited body of work. Vermeer never had any pupils, though one scholar has suggested that Vermeer taught his eldest daughter Maria to paint. Additionally, his family obligations with so many children may have taken up much of his time, as would acting as both an art dealer and inn-keeper in running the family businesses. His time spent serving as head of the guild and his extraordinary precision as a painter may have also limited his output.

Style

Vermeer may have first executed his paintings tonally like most painters of his time, using either monochrome shades of grey ("grisaille") or a limited palette of browns and greys ("dead coloring"), over which he would apply more saturated colors (reds, yellows and blues) in the form of transparent glazes. No drawings have been positively attributed to Vermeer, and his paintings offer few clues to preparatory methods.

There is no other 17th-century artist who employed the exorbitantly expensive pigment ultramarine (derived from natural lapis lazuli) either so lavishly or so early in his career. Vermeer used this in not just elements that are naturally of this colour; he also used it early in a work, beneath subsequent earth colours such as umber and ochre, to subtly tint their shade. This working method most probably was inspired by Vermeer's understanding of Leonardo's observations that the surface of every object partakes of the colour of the adjacent object.

An example of Vermeer using ultramarine as an underpaint is in The Girl with the Wine Glass. The shadows of the red satin dress are underpainted in natural ultramarine, and, owing to this underlying blue paint layer, the red lake and vermilion mixture applied over it acquires a slightly purple, cool and crisp appearance.

Even after Vermeer's evident financial breakdown following the so-called rampjaar (year of disaster) in 1672, he continued to employ natural ultramarine generously, such as in Lady Seated at a Virginal. This could suggest that Vermeer was supplied with materials by a collector, and would coincide with John Michael Montias' theory that Pieter van Ruijven was Vermeer's patron.

Vermeer's works are largely genre pieces and portraits, with the exception of two cityscapes and two allegories. His subjects offer a cross-section of seventeenth-century Dutch society, ranging from the portrayal of a simple milkmaid at work, to the luxury and splendour of rich notables and merchantmen in their roomy houses. Besides these subjects, religious, poetical, musical, and scientific comments can also be found in his work.

Painting materials
One aspect of his meticulous painting technique was Vermeer's choice of pigments. He is best known for his frequent use of the very expensive ultramarine (The Milkmaid), and also lead-tin-yellow (A Lady Writing a Letter), madder lake (Christ in the House of Martha and Mary), and vermilion. He also painted with ochres, bone black and azurite. The claim that he used Indian yellow in Woman Holding a Balance has been disproven by pigment analysis.

In Vermeer's oeuvre, only about 20 pigments have been detected. Of these, seven principal pigments that Vermeer commonly employed are lead white, yellow ochre, vermilion, madder lake, green earth, raw umber, and ivory or bone black.

Theories of mechanical aid

Vermeer's painting techniques have long been a source of debate, given their almost photorealistic attention to detail, despite Vermeer's having had no formal training, and despite only limited evidence that Vermeer had created any preparatory sketches or traces for his paintings.

In 2001, British artist David Hockney published the book Secret Knowledge: Rediscovering the Lost Techniques of the Old Masters, in which he argued that Vermeer (among other Renaissance and Baroque artists including Hans Holbein and Diego Velázquez) used optics to achieve precise positioning in their compositions, and specifically some combination of curved mirrors, camera obscura, and camera lucida. This became known as the Hockney–Falco thesis, named after Hockney and Charles M. Falco, another proponent of the theory.

Philip Steadman published the book Vermeer's Camera: Uncovering the Truth behind the Masterpieces in 2001 which specifically claimed that Vermeer had used a camera obscura to create his paintings. Steadman noted that many of Vermeer's paintings had been painted in the same room, and he found six of his paintings that are precisely the right size if they had been painted from inside a camera obscura in the room's back wall.

Supporters of these theories have pointed to evidence in some of Vermeer's paintings, such as the often-discussed sparkling pearly highlights in Vermeer's paintings, which they argue are the result of the primitive lens of a camera obscura producing halation. It was also postulated that a camera obscura was the mechanical cause of the "exaggerated" perspective seen in The Music Lesson (London, Royal Collection).

In 2008, American entrepreneur and inventor Tim Jenison developed the theory that Vermeer had used a camera obscura along with a "comparator mirror", which is similar in concept to a camera lucida but much simpler and makes it easy to match colour values. He later modified the theory to simply involve a concave mirror and a comparator mirror. He spent the next five years testing his theory by attempting to re-create The Music Lesson himself using these tools, a process captured in the 2013 documentary film Tim's Vermeer.

Several points were brought out by Jenison in support of this technique: first was Vermeer's hyper-accurate rendition of light falloff along the wall. Neurobiologist Colin Blakemore, in an interview with Jenison, notes that human vision cannot process information about the absolute brightness of a scene. Another was the addition of several highlights and outlines consistent with matching the effects of chromatic aberration, particularly noticeable in primitive optics. Last, and perhaps most telling, is a noticeable curvature in the original painting's rendition of the scrollwork on the virginal. This effect matched Jenison's technique precisely, caused by exactly duplicating the view as seen from a curved mirror.

This theory remains disputed. There is no historical evidence regarding Vermeer's interest in optics, and the detailed inventory of the artist's belongings drawn up after his death includes no camera obscura or any similar device. However, Vermeer was in close connection with pioneer lens maker Antonie van Leeuwenhoek, who was his executor after death.

Works

It is believed Vermeer produced a total of fewer than 50 paintings, of which 34 have survived. Only three Vermeer paintings were dated by the artist: The Procuress (1656; Gemäldegalerie, Dresden); The Astronomer (1668; Musée du Louvre, Paris); and The Geographer (1669; Städelsches Kunstinstitut, Frankfurt).

Vermeer's mother-in-law Maria Thins owned Dirck van Baburen's 1622 oil on canvas The Procuress (or a copy of it), which appears in the background of two of Vermeer's paintings. The same subject was also painted by Vermeer. Almost all of Vermeer's paintings are of contemporary subjects in a smaller format, with a cooler palette dominated by blues, yellows, and grays.  Vermeer painted multiple artworks portraying a pure profile like the painting Woman with a Pearl Necklace, which was uncommon in Dutch art at the time. Practically all of his surviving works belong to this period, usually domestic interiors with one or two figures lit by a window on the left. They are characterized by a sense of compositional balance and spatial order, unified by a pearly light. Mundane domestic or recreational activities are imbued with a poetic timelessness (e.g., Girl Reading a Letter at an Open Window, Dresden, Gemäldegalerie). Vermeer's two townscapes have also been attributed to this period: View of Delft (The Hague, Mauritshuis) and The Little Street (Amsterdam, Rijksmuseum).

A few of his paintings show a certain hardening of manner and are generally thought to represent his late works. From this period come The Allegory of Faith (c. 1670; Metropolitan Museum of Art, New York) and The Love Letter (c. 1670; Rijksmuseum, Amsterdam).

Legacy

Originally, Vermeer's works were largely overlooked by art historians for two centuries after his death. A select number of connoisseurs in the Netherlands did appreciate his work, yet even so, many of his works were attributed to then better-known artists such as Metsu or Mieris. The Delft master's modern rediscovery began about 1860, when German museum director Gustav Waagen saw The Art of Painting in the Czernin gallery in Vienna and recognized the work as a Vermeer, though it was attributed to Pieter de Hooch at that time. Research by Théophile Thoré-Bürger culminated in the publication of his catalogue raisonné of Vermeer's works in the Gazette des Beaux-Arts in 1866. Thoré-Bürger's catalogue drew international attention to Vermeer and listed more than 70 works by him, including many that he regarded as uncertain.

Upon the rediscovery of Vermeer's work, several prominent Dutch artists modelled their style on his work, including Simon Duiker. Other artists who were inspired by Vermeer include Danish painter Wilhelm Hammershoi and American Thomas Wilmer Dewing. In the 20th century, Vermeer's admirers included Salvador Dalí, who painted his own version of The Lacemaker (on commission from collector Robert Lehman) and pitted large copies of the original against a rhinoceros in some surrealist experiments. Dali also celebrated the master in The Ghost of Vermeer of Delft Which Can Be Used As a Table, 1934.

Han van Meegeren was a 20th-century Dutch painter who worked in the classical tradition. He became a master forger, motivated by a blend of aesthetic and financial reasons, creating and selling many new "Vermeers" before turning himself in for forgery to avoid being charged with capital treason for collaboration with the Nazis, specifically, in selling what had been believed to be original artwork to the Nazis.

On the evening of 23 September 1971, a 21-year-old hotel waiter, Mario Pierre Roymans, stole Vermeer's Love Letter from the Fine Arts Palace in Brussels where it was on loan from the Rijksmuseum for the exhibition Rembrandt and his Age.

To mark the 26th anniversary of the opening of an exhibition at Washington, DC's National Gallery of Art featuring his work, Google honored Vermeer with a Google Doodle on 12 November 2021.

A 2023 exhibition at the Rijksmuseum in Amsterdam features 28 of his works, the most ever shown together.

In popular culture

Vermeer's reputation and works have been featured in both literature and in films. Tracy Chevalier's novel Girl with a Pearl Earring (1999), and the 2003 film of the same name, present a fictional account of Vermeer's creation of the famous painting and his relationship with the equally fictional model.

Many artists are inspired by the famous painter, for example, culinary photographer Aimee Twigger draws on Vermeer's chiaroscuro for her gustatory journeys through recipes.

Gallery of selected works

Notes

References

Sources

Further reading
 
 
 
 
 
 
 
  In

External links

 500 pages on Vermeer and Delft
 Johannes Vermeer, biography at Artble
 Essential Vermeer, website dedicated to Johannes Vermeer
 Johannes Vermeer in the Encyclopædia Britannica
 Vermeer Center Delft, center with tours about Vermeer
 Vermeer's Mania for Maps, WGBHForum, 30 December 2016
 Pigment analyses of many of Vermeer's paintings at Colourlex
 Location of Vermeer's The Little Street 

 
1632 births
1675 deaths
Burials at the Oude Kerk, Delft
Converts to Roman Catholicism from Calvinism
Dutch genre painters
Dutch Golden Age painters
Dutch male painters
Dutch Roman Catholics
Painters from Delft
Artists from Delft
Dutch art collectors
Dutch art dealers
Cartography in the Dutch Republic
Early modern Netherlandish cartography